William Snow may refer to:

 William W. Snow (1812–1886), U.S. Representative from New York
 William Snow (actor) (born 1960), Australian actor
 William P. Snow (1907–1986), U.S. Ambassador to Burma and Paraguay
 William B. Snow (1903–1968), American Acoustical engineer
 William J. Snow (1868–1947), United States Army general
 William Parker Snow (1817–1895), Arctic explorer, writer, and mariner
 William Snow (priest), Dean of Bristol, 1542–1551
 William Snow, painter of the dome of St Mary Abchurch in London
 William Freeman Snow, Stanford University professor affiliated with formation of the American Social Health Association